Antispila metallella is a moth of the family Heliozelidae. It is found from Scandinavia to the Pyrenees, Alps and Romania and from Great Britain to Russia.

The wingspan is 8–9 mm. Adults are bronzy metallic with paler metallic markings. They are on wing in May.

The larvae feed on Cornus alba, Cornus mas and Cornus sanguinea. They mine the leaves of their host plant. The mine starts as a short corridor close to the leaf margin. It later widens into a large blotch, that often overruns the initial corridor. Full-grown larva make an oval excision in which they drop the ground. They continue feeding from within this excision which is now used as a case. Pupation takes place within the case. Larvae can be found from July to August.

References

Moths described in 1775
Heliozelidae
Moths of Europe
Insects of Turkey